The Basilica of the Twenty-Six Holy Martyrs of Japan (日本二十六聖殉教者聖堂) also  is a Roman Catholic minor basilica and Co-cathedral in Nagasaki, Japan, built soon after the end of the Japanese government's Seclusion Policy in 1853. It is also known as the Church of the 26 Japanese Martyrs. For many years it was the only Western-style building declared a national treasure, and is said to be the oldest Christian church in Japan.

History
In 1863, two French priests from the Société des Missions Étrangères, Fathers Louis Furet and Bernard Petitjean, landed in Nagasaki with the intention of building a church honoring the Twenty-Six Martyrs of Japan, eight European priests, one Mexican priest and seventeen Japanese Christians who were crucified in 1597 by order of Toyotomi Hideyoshi. The church was finished in 1864. Constructed by the master carpenter of the Glover Residence, Koyama Hidenoshin, it was originally a small wooden church with three aisles and three octagonal towers. The present structure is a much larger Gothic basilica that dates from around 1879. This version was built of white stuccoed brick with five aisles, vaulted ceilings, and one octagonal tower. The design most likely came from a Belgian plan used by Catholic missionaries in an earlier church built in Osaka. The stained glass windows were imported from France.

On March 17, 1865, shortly after the completion of the original cathedral, Father Petitjean saw a group of people standing in front of the cathedral. They indicated to the priest that they wanted him to open the doors. As the priest knelt at the altar, an old woman from the group approached him and said "The heart (faith) of all of us is the same as yours. Where is the statue of Holy Mary?" Petitjean discovered that these people were from the nearby village of Urakami and were Kakure Kirishitans, descendants of early Japanese Christians who went into hiding after the Shimabara Rebellion in the 1630s. A white marble statue of the Virgin Mary was imported from France and erected in the church to commemorate this event. The bronze relief in the courtyard below the church shows the memorable scene of the discovery. Before long, tens of thousands of underground Christians came out of hiding in the Nagasaki area. News of this reached Pope Pius IX, who declared this "the miracle of the Orient."

Ōura Cathedral was designated as a National Treasure in 1933. During World War II, the cathedral was damaged by the atomic bomb on August 9, 1945. Artefacts from the damage are in the Nagasaki Atomic Bomb Museum.

The National Treasure designation was affirmed on March 31, 1953 under the 1951 Law for the Protection of Cultural Properties. It was the first Western-style building in Japan to be given this honor and had been the only one until 2009 when the neo-Baroque Akasaka Palace was designated a National Treasure.

The church was granted status as a minor basilica by the Holy See on April 26, 2016 

On June 30, 2018 Ōura Cathedral, along with 11 other sites linked to Catholic persecution in Japan, was added to the UNESCO World Heritage List.

See also
 Twenty-Six Martyrs Museum and Monument

References

External links

 Nagasaki City Tourism Guide - Ōura Cathedral

Basilica churches in Japan
Roman Catholic churches completed in 1879
19th-century Roman Catholic church buildings in Japan
National Treasures of Japan
Religious buildings and structures in Nagasaki Prefecture
Roman Catholic cathedrals in Japan
Giyōfū architecture
Hidden Christian Sites in the Nagasaki Region